Emil Diener is a Swiss bobsledder who competed in the 1930s. He won a gold medal in the two-man event at the 1935 FIBT World Championships in Igls.

References
Bobsleigh two-man world championship medalists since 1931

Possibly living people
Swiss male bobsledders
Year of birth missing
20th-century Swiss people